AJGAR was a suggested alliance of the Ahir, Jat, Gurjar and Rajput castes. It was first proposed by Sir Chhotu Ram, a rural leader and politician in pre-independence India as a form of peasant-alliance. 

The theory was later used by Charan Singh in the 1970s as a part of his Kisan-Politics to break the monopoly of Indian National Congress in Uttar Pradesh. He subscribed to this theory that Ahirs, Jats, Gurjars and Rajputs are of the same social and racial group, the Kshatriya.

Aims and objectives
The backward castes are prosperous throughout the state of Uttar Pradesh and constitute the mid-strata of the village social structure. Their social conditions largely correspond to their economic position, better than the Scheduled Castes and nearer to the higher castes. AJGAR emerged to gain political power in the state.

Political outcome
In Western Uttar Pradesh, the wealth and power of AJGAR alliance increased during the Green Revolution period, but the AJGAR formula failed to gain widespread support. However, later in 1989, the leader V. P. Singh used the AJGAR cluster successfully to conjoin the Other Backward Classes and Rajputs.

See also
Triveni Sangh
KHAM theory

References

Identity politics in India
Politics of Uttar Pradesh
Politics of Haryana
Ahir
Jat
Gurjar
Rajputs